Pružina is a village and municipality in Považská Bystrica District in the Trenčín Region of north-western Slovakia.

Pružina is also a surname that comes from the village of Pružina and is very uncommon.

History
Several important sites and artifacts have been discovered in the area of the village and close neighborhood, including a depot of bronze jewelry dated to early La Tène-period and gold and silver Celtic coins (Michalová Hill). In Pružina-Mesciská, a hillfort existed in the Early Middle Ages and several Slavic burial mounds have been discovered in the wider area. A large iron depot discovered in Mesciská dated to the Great Moravian period is the largest collection of this type in Slovakia.

In historical records the village was first mentioned in 1272 as Prusina, then in 1330 as Prusinn, in 1364 as Pruzina, later Pruzsina until 1899, then it was renamed to Barossháza after Gábor Baross. Since the 16th century until 1863 today's Mojtín was part of the village. As part of Czechoslovakia, Slovakia, Pružina has been its official name.

Geography
The municipality lies at an altitude of 381 metres and covers an area of 40.430 km². It has a population of about 1917 people.

People
 Gábor Baross, (1848 in Barossháza – 1892) statesman.
 Štefan Závodník, local priest; the local chapel was built on his order

References

Citations

Bibliography

External links

 
http://www.statistics.sk/mosmis/eng/run.html

Villages and municipalities in Považská Bystrica District